No Limit is a youth action comedy film directed by Fu Huayang; starring Hans Zhang, Zheng Shuang, Xing Yu and Melrose Hu. The film was released in China on August 12, 2011.

Plot
Wu Jixian is a cheerful and sunny boy who possesses great racing skills. One day, while delivering an important document for a V.I.P client, he bumps into and disrupts a performance by Xiao An and a group of roller skating youths led by Feng Xingzi. In a bid to show off, Feng Xingzi displays his car racing skills and offends Xiao An. In the midst of this, the baggage in his hands is snatched away by Feng Xingzi. The group of youths does not realise that the baggage contains a genetic sample meant to counter a deadly virus; and a mysterious parrot sent by a crime organization is currently hunting for the baggage. An thrilling adventure and chase thus ensues, as Wu Jixian and his new-found friends seek to recover the baggage and prevent the loss of lives.

Cast
Hans Zhang as Wu Jixian
Zheng Shuang as Xiao An
Xing Yu as Neng Rang
Melrose Hu as Na Na
Cao Shuai as Feng Xingzi
Fu Huayang as Leader of the Black Society 
Jiang Yufei as Killer A
Tang Jin as Killer B 
Zhou Tongtong as Killer C

Music
No Limit Love (极限爱恋) by Hans Zhang and Zheng Shuang

References

External links
 

Chinese action comedy films
Chinese auto racing films
Chinese teen films
Chinese sports comedy films
Films directed by Fu Huayang
2011 action comedy films
2011 films
2010s sports comedy films